Tricheco (italian for Walrus) was the name of at least two ships of the Italian Navy and may refer to:

 , a  launched in 1909 and discarded in 1918.
 , a  launched in 1930 and sunk in 1942.

Italian Navy ship names